Hanna Kyrychenko also spelled Ganna, née Ganna Lisieienkova (born ) is a Ukrainian female volleyball player, playing as a right side hitter.

She was part of the Ukraine women's national volleyball team. 
She competed at the 2011 Women's European Volleyball Championship, the 2015 Summer Universiade, the 2017 Summer Universiade and the 2017 Women's European Volleyball Championship.

References

External links
http://www.cev.lu/competition-area/PlayerDetails.aspx?TeamID=7583&PlayerID=1758&ID=553
http://www.worldofvolley.com/wov-community/players/8404/ganna-lisieienkova.html

1991 births
Living people
Ukrainian women's volleyball players
Place of birth missing (living people)
Universiade medalists in volleyball
Universiade silver medalists for Ukraine
Universiade bronze medalists for Ukraine
Medalists at the 2015 Summer Universiade
Medalists at the 2017 Summer Universiade